Sybra dorsata is a species of beetle in the family Cerambycidae. It was described by Fairmaire in 1881.

References

dorsata
Beetles described in 1881